The UWA/UWF Intercontinental Tag Team Championship was a tag team championship created from the working relationship between the Mexican Universal Wrestling Association and the Japanese Universal Lucha Libre (also called Universal Wrestling Federation) from 1991 to 1993, when the title became inactive. The championship was revived in 2001 by Michinoku Pro Wrestling, and later moved to its final home, Kaientai Dojo, the following year. The title was abandoned in 2005, when it was replaced with Kaientai Dojo's Strongest-K Tag Team Championship instead.

As it was a professional wrestling championship, the championship was not won not by actual competition, but by a scripted ending to a match determined by the bookers and match makers. On occasion the promotion declares a championship vacant, which means there is no champion at that point in time. This can either be due to a storyline, or real life issues such as a champion suffering an injury being unable to defend the championship, or leaving the company.

Title history

See also
UWA World Tag Team Championship
WWF Intercontinental Tag Team Championship
Tohoku Tag Team Championship
Strongest-K Tag Team Championship

Footnotes

References

External links
UWA/UWF Intercontinental Tag Team Title

Active Advance Pro Wrestling championships
Tag team wrestling championships
Universal Wrestling Association championships
Intercontinental professional wrestling championships